Star of the Desert Arena is a 6,500-seat indoor arena located in Primm, Nevada, United States. It is used primarily for concerts, and is part of the Buffalo Bill's hotel and casino, one of the Primm Valley Resorts.

Although Primm is near the California-Nevada state line, it is considered part of the Las Vegas market because it is located in Clark County, and for that reason Star of the Desert Arena is a popular Las Vegas stop for many mid-sized concert tours. Additionally, many Mexican recording artists have performed at the arena whenever they have been in Las Vegas.

Additionally, Star of the Desert Arena is used for boxing, wrestling, trade shows, conventions and other sporting events.

References

External links
Official website

Convention centers in the Las Vegas Valley
Indoor arenas in Nevada
Indoor arenas in Las Vegas
Sports venues in Las Vegas
Buildings and structures in Primm, Nevada